The Ramu stunt disease is a disease of the sugarcane widespread throughout Papua New Guinea, but not detected in Australia. Eumetopina flavipes, the island sugarcane planthopper, is a species of planthopper present throughout South East Asia which is a vector for the disease.

It was first detected in the 1980s. It is thought to be either of viral origin or associated with a Phytoplasma bacterium.

See also 
 Ramu, a river in northern Papua New Guinea
 Stunt (botany), a plant disease that results in dwarfing and loss of vigor

References 

Sugarcane diseases
Agriculture in Papua New Guinea